Annobón Airport  is an airport in San Antonio de Palé, Annobón, Equatorial Guinea.

Overview 
The airport is west of San Antonio de Palé on the southern island of Annobón. It was inaugurated October 15, 2013 in the presence of Teodoro Obiang Nguema Mbasogo, the President of Equatorial Guinea.

Airlines and destinations

See also

 List of airports in Equatorial Guinea
 Transport in Equatorial Guinea

References

External links
 HERE Maps - Annobón
 OpenStreetMap - Annobón
 OurAirports - Annobón

Bata, Equatorial Guinea
Annobón
Airports in Equatorial Guinea